An ink ball, inking ball, or dabber was a tool used in printmaking and letterpress printing to apply ink to the plate or type to be printed.

Ink balls had been used since the dawn of the printing press in the 15th century. In printmaking, they were used individually, to make the ink smooth and applying it. In letterpress printing, they were used in pairs: ink was placed on one of the two balls, which were then held together and worked around until a proper thickness, consistency, and uniformity was reached. The inker then "beat" the type to apply the ink, making sure to get neither too much nor too little ink on the form. 

An ink ball consists of a piece of specially-treated sheepskin stuffed with wool, with wooden cupped rod as a handle ("stock"). After the invention of composition (a mixture of glue, molasses, and tar) in the early 19th century, some ink balls began to be made from that until they faded from use. 

By the mid- to late-19th century, they had been largely superseded by the composition roller and the rubber roller or "brayer". The replacing of the labor-intensive ink balls, which had to be worked by hand, with mechanized rollers was a key factor to the growth of mechanized printing machines in the 19th century.

References

Inks
Letterpress printing